The 2018 Women's Tour de Yorkshire was a two-day cycling stage race staged in Yorkshire over 3 and 4 May 2018. It is the third edition of the Women's Tour de Yorkshire, organised by Welcome to Yorkshire and the Amaury Sport Organisation - but the first multi-day stage race.

Route

Classification leadership table

References

External links

Official website

2018 in English sport
2018 in women's road cycling
Women
2018 in English women's sport